Vedic Sanskrit is the name given by modern scholarship to the oldest, attested form of the Proto-Indo-Aryan language. This is the language that was used in the religious hymns known as the Vedas, in particular, the Ṛg-Veda, the oldest of them, dated to have been composed roughly over the period from 1500 to 1000 BCE. It was a purely spoken language during that period used before the introduction of writing in the language.

Vedic Sanskrit has inherited from its parent the Proto-Indo-European language an elaborate system of morphology, much of which has been preserved in Sanskrit as a whole than in other kindred languages such as Ancient Greek or Latin.

Its grammar differs in certain respects from the grammar of the later Classical Sanskrit.

History 

The language descended from Proto-Indo-European named Indic or Proto-Indo-Aryan entered the Indian subcontinent with the arrival of the Indo-Aryans dated to be around 1800–1500 BCE. The Vedic hymns are estimated to have been composed between 1500 and 1000 BCE, with the language of each hymn fixed at the time of its oral composition, establishing a religious canon around a literary tradition.

As the popular speech unavoidably evolved over the centuries the Vedic hymns began to be increasingly inaccessible. In order to "arrest" language change, there arose a rigorous linguistic tradition aimed at preserving the literary language, culminating in the work of Pāṇini's Aṣṭādhyayī, dated around 600–400 BCE, which marks the beginning of 'Sanskrit', referred to in contradistinction to the Vedic language as 'Classical Sanskrit'.

Despite these efforts, by the time of Pāṇini's final definition, the language had undergone some changes, especially in grammar. The following sections will focus on these differences between the Vedic and Classical Sanskrit. Those features that were incorporated into the 'official definition' by Panini can be seen in Classical Sanskrit and related pages.

Differences between Vedic and Classical Sanskrit

Morphologically, as a general rule, the later language has fewer forms and is more regular.

 Vedic used the older athematic approach to inflexion far more than the classical language, which tended to replace them using thematic forms in their place.
 The subjunctive mood of Vedic was also lost in Classical Sanskrit.
 The three synthetic past tenses (imperfect, perfect and aorist) were still clearly distinguished semantically in Vedic.
 A fifth mood, the injunctive, also existed.
 There were more than 12 ways of forming infinitives in Vedic, of which Classical Sanskrit retained only one form.
 ī-stems differentiate the devī́ and vrkī́s feminines, a difference lost in Classical Sanskrit.

Nouns

Basics 

Declension of a noun in Sanskrit involves the interplay of two 'dimensions': 3 numbers and 8 cases, yielding a combination of 24 possible forms, although owing to syncretism of some forms, the practical number can be lower. 

In addition, adjectives behave much the same way morphologically as nouns do, and can conveniently be considered together. While the same noun cannot be seen to be of more than one gender, adjectives change gender on the basis of the noun they are being applied to, along with case and number, thus giving the following variables:

Building blocks

Roots 

The oldest system of declension was to affix the endings directly to the nominal root. This was an ancient feature already in decline in later Proto-Indo-European. Of the daughter languages, this system has been best preserved by Vedic Sanskrit.

Stems 

In Proto-Indo-European, a new system developed wherein an intermediary called the thematic vowel is inserted to the root before the final endings are appended: *-o- which in Sanskrit becomes -a-, producing the thematic stem.

Declension of a thematic stem is less complicated owing to the fact that a host of Sandhi rules apply no more, and the later stages of the Sanskrit language see an increase in the profusion of thematic nouns. Thus in classical Sanskrit, the thematic pā́da-s is more likely to be found than its athematic predecessor.

Cases 

Sanskrit nouns are declined for eight cases:

nominative: marks the subject of a verb. 
accusative: used for the direct object of a transitive verb.
genitive: marks a noun as modifying another noun.
dative: used to indicate the indirect object of a transitive verb.
instrumental: marks the instrument or means by, or with, which the subject achieves or accomplishes an action. 
ablative: used to express motion away from something.
locative: corresponds vaguely to the English prepositions in, on, at, and by.
vocative: used for a word that identifies an addressee.

Endings 

The basic scheme of suffixation is given in the table below and applies to many nouns and adjectives.

However, according to the gender and the final consonant or vowel of the uninflected word-stem, there are internal sandhi rules dictating the form of the inflected word. Furthermore, these are standalone forms, which when used in actual phrases are subject to external sandhi.

Root Declension

This is the old athematic method of Proto-Indo-European declension still in active use in Vedic.

Root ī-stem,  vṛkī́s and devī́- feminines

A group of 80 polysyllabic ī-stems, most of which are feminine, are accented on the final vowel. Known as vṛkī́s feminines, these exhibit different behavior during declension compared to the later language, such as the nominative singular retaining the -s ending, and in the accent staying on the -i-.

Further, a number of largely feminine ī-stems, known as the devī́-feminines, also exhibit some differences compared to the later language.

These, along with root stems in -ī, can be seen below:

Compounds

Vedic Sanskrit inherits from the Proto-Indo-European period the ability to combine two or more words into a single one treated as a simple word with regard to accent, inflexion and construction.

The Vedic language, both in the frequency and the length of the compounds is very similar to the Greek of Homer. In the Ṛg-veda and the Atharvaveda, no compounds of more than 3 independent members are found, and even compounds of 3 members are rare: pūrva·kāma·kṛ́tvan, "fulfilling former wishes." In the later language, both the frequency and the number of words used to form compounds greatly increases.

The main types of compound-forming were the co-ordinative , determinative , possessive  and the adverbial .

Numerals

See Sanskrit Numerals

Verbs

Basics

Verb conjugation in Sanskrit involves the interplay of number, person, voice, mood and tense, with the following variables:

Further, participles are considered part of the verbal systems although they are not verbs themselves, and as with other Sanskrit nouns, they can be declined across seven or eight cases, for three genders and three numbers.

As many as a dozen types of infinitives can be found in Vedic, although only a couple of types are frequent.

Building blocks

Stem formation

The starting point for conjugation is the root. As a first step, the root may be subject to treatment to form a stem, before which personal endings are suffixed. The types of possible treatment are:

 Suffixion: the theme vowel -a- may be appended, or one of several other suffixes -ya-, -ó- / -nó-, -nā-, and -aya-.
 Infixion: A nasal infix (n, ñ, ṇ, ṅ) may be inserted within the root, which when accented is -ná-.
 The root may undergo reduplication.
 In some tenses or moods, the augment á- may be prefixed.
 In many cases, the accent may vary between the root and the ending, accompanied by corresponding changes in the gradation of the root vowel.

If V is the vowel of the zero grade, the -grade vowel is traditionally thought of as a + V, and the -grade vowel as ā + V.

Personal endings

Conjugational endings in Vedic convey person, number, and voice. Different forms of the endings are used depending on what tense stem and mood they are attached to. Verb stems or the endings themselves may be changed or obscured by sandhi.

The primary, secondary, perfect and imperative endings are essentially the same as seen in Classic Sanskrit. The subjunctive endings can be seen below:

Primary endings are used with present indicative and future forms. Secondary endings are used with the imperfect, conditional, aorist, and optative. Perfect, imperative and subjunctive endings are used with the perfect, imperative and subjunctive respectively.

Conjugation

Present system
The present system includes the present tense, the imperfect, and the optative, imperative and subjunctive moods, and well as rare occurrences of injunctive

Perfect system
The perfect is used mainly in the indicative. The stem is formed with reduplication as with the present system.

The perfect system also produces separate "strong" and "weak" forms of the verb — the strong form is used with the singular active, and the weak form with the rest.

The perfect in the Sanskrit can be in form of the simple perfect and the periphrastic perfect.

The Simple Perfect can form an augmented Pluperfect, and beyond the indicative mood it can also form Perfect Subjunctives, Optatives, and Imperatives. All of these are lost in Classical Sanskrit, when it forms only indicatives.

The simple perfect is the most common form and can be made from most of the roots. The simple perfect stem is made by reduplication and if necessary by stem lengthening. The conjugated form takes special perfect endings. The periphrastic perfect is used with causative, desiderative, denominative and roots with prosodic long anlauted vowel (except a/ā). Only few roots can form both the simple and the periphrastic perfect. These are  'carry',  'burn', vid 'know', bhi 'to be afraid', hu 'sacrifice'.

Aorist system
The aorist system includes aorist proper (with past indicative meaning, e.g. abhūs 'you were') and some of the forms of the ancient injunctive (used almost exclusively with mā in prohibitions, e.g. mā bhūs 'don't be'). The principal distinction of the two is presence/absence of an augment – a- prefixed to the stem.

The aorist system stem actually has three different formations: the simple aorist, the reduplicating aorist (semantically related to the causative verb), and the sibilant aorist. The simple aorist is taken directly from the root stem (e.g. bhū-: a-bhū-t 'he was'). The reduplicating aorist involves reduplication as well as vowel reduction of the stem. The sibilant aorist is formed with the suffixation of s to the stem. The sibilant aorist by itself has four formations:
 athematic s-aorist
 athematic -aorist
 athematic -aorist
 thematic s-aorist

Future system

Examples of conjugation

Comprehensive conjugation tables can be found in the Classical Sanskrit page linked above. Some notes on elements specific to Vedic Sanskrit below:

 bhū – 'to be'

The optative takes secondary endings. -ya- is added to the stem both in the active and the middle. In some forms the cluster ya is dropped out.

The subjunctive takes subjunctive endings.

The following stems can take all endings.

 as – 'to be'

Infinitives

The most notable difference between Vedic and Classical Sanskrit is in the area of the infinitive. Against the single type of infinitive in the later language, there exist, in Vedic, several forms, all of them being old cases of verbal nouns.

The following main types of infinitive can be identified in Vedic, noted in descending order of frequency:

 Dative
 Accusative
 Ablative-genitive
 Locative

Dative infinitive

The ending used to form this adjective is -e. The ending may be directly added to the root, whether of a simple or compounded verb, or additional elements (-as-, -i, -ti, -tu, -tavā, -tyā, -dhyā, -man, -van) may be interspersed in different cases of roots.

Accusative infinitive

The ending used here is either -am affixed to the weak form of a root, or -tum just as in the Latin supine. The latter form is the only one that survives in Classical Sanskrit.

Ablative-genitive infinitive

This functions more as a verbal noun than a genuine infinitive. There are again two ways of forming this: -as or -tos.

Locative infinitive

This is very rare, even in the oldest language. Between the root and the locative ending -i, -tar- or -san- may be inserted.

Syntax
Because of Vedic's complex declension system the word order is free (with tendency toward SOV).

Sample

Sample Vedic Sanskrit text with accentuation etc.:

{{blockquote|
|
|The Ṛg-Veda, X. 125}}

I roam with the Rudras and the Vasus, I with the Ādityas and the all-gods,
I bear both Mitra and Varuṇa, I Indra and Agni, I both the Aśvins.

I bear the swollen soma, I Tvaṣṭar and Pūṣan and Bhaga,
I establish wealth for the man offering the oblation, who pursues well, who sacrifices and presses.

I am ruler, assembler of goods, observer foremost among those deserving the sacrifice,
Me have the gods distributed in many places – so that I have many stations and cause many things to enter (me).

Through me he eats food – whoever sees, whoever breathes, whoever hears what is spoken,
Without thinking about it, they live on me. Listen, o you who are listened to: it's a trustworthy thing I tell you.

See also
 Sanskrit grammar
 Sanskrit nouns
 Sanskrit verbs
 Classical Sanskrit
 Vedic accent
 Proto-Indo-Aryan
 Proto-Indo-Iranian
 Proto-Indo-European

 Notes 

 Glossary 

 Traditional glossary and notes 

References

Bibliography
 Ernst Wilhelm Oskar Windisch, Berthold Delbrück, Die altindische Wortfolge aus dem Catagathabrahmana 
 Arthur Anthony Macdonell, Vedic Grammar (1910)
 Arthur Anthony MacDonell, A Vedic Grammar for Students. Bombay, Oxford University Press. (1916/1975)
 Bruno Lindner, '''Altindische Nominalbildung: Nach den  dargestellt (1878) 
 Michael Witzel, Tracing the Vedic dialects in Dialectes dans les litteratures Indo-Aryennes ed. Caillat, Paris, 1989, 97–265.
 Müller M., Sanskrit Grammatik, Leipzig (1868)
 Renou L., Grammaire de la langue védique, Paris (1952)
 William Dwight Whitney, Sanskrit Grammar. 5th edn. Delhi: Motilal Banarsidass Publishers. (1924) [1st ed. 1879]
 Coulson, Michael, Sanskrit (teach yourself), McGraw Hill (2003)
 Fortson IV, Benjamin W – Indo-European Language and Culture – 2nd Ed – Wiley-Blackwell (2010) – 
 Burrow, T – The Sanskrit Language – 
 Bucknell, Roderick S – Sanskrit Grammar – 
 Reich, David – Who we are and how we got here – 1st End – (2019) – 
 Jamison, Stephanie W., Brereton, Joel P.,  The Rigveda,  Oxford University Press, 2020

External links
 Paul Kiparsky "The Vedic Injunctive: Historical and Synchronic Implications"
 Paul Kiparsky "Aspect and Event Structure in Vedic"
 Daniel Baum "The Imperative in the Rigveda"
 "The «Virtually Unknown» Benedictive Middle in Classical Sanskrit"
 The Sanskrit Heritage Site

Vedic grammar
Indo-Aryan grammars
Indo-Iranian grammars
Indo-European grammars